The XL-Viewer 5000 is a senior elderly smartphone especially developed for the use by the elderly. This smartphone has a 1Ghz MediaTek Dual-Core processor, 512MB RAM, 4GB ROM, 3.5Inch IPS WVGA TFT screen, 5-points multi-touch touchscreen, Dual-SIM 2G 3G, GPS, Wi-Fi, Bluetooth 4.0, 5 Mega Pixel camera, SOS-Panic button, 2500mAh battery and runs on a Nucleus RTOS system as Android as its operating system with a user-friendly and basic XL-Viewer interface. The design of this phone is ergonomic and has an IP rating water resistant housing. The phone supports multiple-languages and shares location by GPS when the SOS button is used.

See also 
Rugged computers

References 

Smartphones
Mobile phones introduced in 2015